Thomas Greenway was an Oxford college head in the 16th-century.

Greenway was born in Hampshire and educated at Corpus Christi College, Oxford. He became a Fellow of Corpus in 1541. He held the livings at Bowers Gifford, Rettendon, Winterbourne Earls and Heyford Purcell. Greenway was President of Corpus Christi College, Oxford, from 1562 until 1568. He died in August 1571.

References

1571 deaths
Alumni of Corpus Christi College, Oxford
Fellows of Corpus Christi College, Oxford
Presidents of Corpus Christi College, Oxford
16th-century English people
People from Hampshire